Wilson's spiny mouse (Acomys wilsoni) is a species of rodent in the family Muridae.
It is found in Ethiopia, Kenya, Somalia, South Sudan, Tanzania, and Uganda. Its natural habitats are dry savanna, subtropical or tropical dry shrubland, and rocky areas.Molecular evidence suggests that spiny mice (Acomys) are genetically more closely related to gerbils (Gerbillinae) than they are to actual mice (Muridae) based on their murine morphology.

References

Acomys
Rodents of Africa
Mammals described in 1892
Taxa named by Oldfield Thomas
Taxonomy articles created by Polbot